The Australia national beach handball team are the national team of Australia. It is governed by the Australian Handball Federation and takes part in international beach handball competitions.

The Australian teams of both Women and Men were present to all world championships and world games since 2010. Both teams are currently preparing for the 2016 world championships in Budapest (Hungary) during July 2016.

The qualifier Oceania took place in Gold Coast at the end of February 2016. Both the Women and Men team have won the Oceania Qualifiers and won a spot in the 2016 World Cup.

Results

World Championships

World Games

Oceania Championship

References

External links
Official website
IHF profile

Beach handball
National beach handball teams
Beach handball